Langley may refer to:

People
 Langley (surname), a common English surname, including a list of notable people with the name
 Dawn Langley Simmons (1922–2000), English author and biographer
 Langley Wakeman Collyer (1885–1947), one of the Collyer brothers
 Langley Fox (born 1989), American illustrator and model
 Lang Hancock (1909–1992) Australian iron ore magnate
 Langley Kirkwood (born 1973), South African actor and triathlete
 Langley Frank Willard Smith (1897–1917) Canadian flying ace

Places

Australia
Langley, Victoria

Canada
Langley, British Columbia (district municipality), or Township of Langley, a district municipality in the Lower Mainland of British Columbia
Fort Langley, a community in the Township of Langley, historically referred to simply as "Langley"
Langley, British Columbia (city), or City of Langley, a separately incorporated urban municipality encompassed by the Township of Langley
Langley (electoral district), a Canadian federal electoral district in British Columbia
Langley (provincial electoral district), a provincial electoral district centred on Langley, British Columbia

France
Langley, Vosges

United Kingdom
Langley, Berkshire, also known as Langley Marish, formerly in Buckinghamshire
Langley, Cheshire
Langley, Derbyshire
Langley, Yarnscombe, Devon, former seat of the Pollard family
Langley, Essex also known as Langley Upper Green and Langley Lower Green
Langley, Gloucestershire, a location
Langley, Greater Manchester, an area of Middleton
Langley, Hampshire
Langley, Hertfordshire
Langley, Kent
Langley, Norfolk
Langley, Northumberland
Langley Castle
Langley, Oxfordshire
Langley, Shropshire
Langley Chapel
Langley, Somerset, a location
Langley, Surrey, a location
Langley, Warwickshire
Langley, West Midlands, a location
Langley, West Sussex
Langley Burrell, Wiltshire

United States
Langley, Arkansas
Langley, Illinois
Langley, Kansas
Langley, Kentucky
Langley, Oklahoma
Langley, Virginia
George Bush Center for Intelligence, or simply 'Langley', the Central Intelligence Agency headquarters
Langley Air Force Base, Hampton, Virginia
Langley Research Center, NASA Langley, Hampton, Virginia
Langley, Washington
Mount Langley, California

Schools
 Langley Academy, Slough, Berkshire, England
 Langley College, fictional school in the American sitcom The Facts of Life
 Langley High School (disambiguation), several schools
 Langley School (disambiguation), several schools

Other uses
Langley (constructor), a former racing car constructor
Langley (crater), a lunar crater
Langley (unit), a unit of measurement of solar radiation
, several ships of the United States Navy
RFA Fort Langley (A230), a stores ship

See also
 Kington Langley, Wiltshire, England, a village
 Langley Green (disambiguation)
 Langley Hall (disambiguation)
 Langley Island (disambiguation)
 Langley Mill (disambiguation)
 Langley Park (disambiguation)
 Langley Speedway (disambiguation)
 Langley Wood (disambiguation)